NAM (National Arbitration and Mediation) is a provider of Alternative Dispute Resolution (ADR) services, including Arbitration and Mediation  NAM provides services to business entities and individuals who seek to resolve their dispute/conflict outside of the court system.  The company maintains rosters of neutrals in all 50 states, Puerto Rico and in major cities around the world.

History 

NAM was founded in 1992 by Roy Israel, its President and CEO, and is headquartered in Garden City, New York.  The company went public in 1996 and was a NASDAQ-listed company owned by public shareholders.  In early 2005, it was privatized and remains so to this day.

Alternative Dispute Resolution (ADR) Practice Areas 

NAM offers Mediation, Arbitration, Alternative Dispute Resolution (ADR), conflict resolution, Settlement conferences, Discovery Referees, Litigation Management, Baseball Arbitration, High/Low Arbitration, Complex multi-party Dispute Resolution, In Person Hearings, Hearings/Trial by Written Submission, National and International Initiatives, Online and Offline Case Management, Trial Preparation Services, Mock Jury Trials, Dispute Resolution Training, Videoconferencing, myADR, CLE (Continuing Legal Education).
 
Subject areas include:  Personal Injury, Product Liability, Negligence, Toxic Tort, Business/Commercial, Bankruptcy, Breach of Contract, Franchise, Professional Liability/Malpractice(Medical Malpractice, Podiatric Malpractice, Dental Malpractice, Nursing Home, Attorney/Legal Malpractice, Accounting Malpractice, Architectural, Director and Officer), Employment (Harassment, Discrimination, Wrongful Termination, Wage & Hour, FLSA, Retaliation, Family and Medical Leave Act, Title VII, Severance Contracts, Non-Compete Agreements, ERISA), Labor, Union and Collective Bargaining, Legal Ethics, Art Law, Banking & Finance, Bankruptcy,  Insurance Coverage, Environmental, Land Use, Construction, Civil Rights, Real Estate Disputes, Landlord/Tenant,  Partnership Disputes, Dissolution Proceedings, Intellectual Property (Copyright, Trademark, Patent, Infringement, Trade Secrets), E-Discovery, Consumer Transactions and Claims, Cruise Line Disputes (Seafarer and Crew Member claims, Passenger Ticket Contract) Trust & Estates, Matrimonial, Sports Law, Entertainment Law, International Law, Maritime Law/Jones Act, Negligence, Premises Liability, Property/Land Law/Leasing, Securities/Financial, Government/Public Agency, International,  Life Health & Disability.

Continuing Legal Education (CLE) 
NAM provides complimentary continuing legal education (CLE) programs for attorneys at law firms, bar associations, corporate legal departments, government legal departments, and other legal and business organizations. The presenters and panel of neutrals offer substantial experience as arbitrators and mediators in all fields of civil litigation.

Awards/Accolades 
For the ninth year in a row, NAM was named a top ADR firm in the United States by the 2022 National Law Journal Best Of Survey. Two of NAM's Mediators were voted in the Top 3 in that same survey.   
 
 
 The company was also voted a Top National ADR Provider by the 2021 Corporate Counsel Best Of Survey. In 2022, the New York Law Journal Best Of Survey selected NAM as the #1 ADR firm in New York State and has done so for the past twelve years. NAM was also voted the #1 Continuing Legal Education (CLE) Provider and the #1 Online ADR Resource by this year's survey respondents. Further, eight of the Top 10 mediator spots and seven of the Top 10 arbitrator spots were awarded to NAM neutrals.

The National Law Journal named Roy Israel, NAM's Founder and Chairman and 7 of NAM’s neutrals, Alternative Dispute Resolution Champions, part of a select group of only 46 nationwide.  NAM was also vote the #1 ADR Provider in the 2022 New Jersey Law Journal Best of Survey. 
In 2021, the company was named a Top Online ADR Resource in the Best of the Midwest Survey  and in 2020, the firm was voted a Top Online ADR Resource in the New Jersey, Texas Lawyer, New England Best of Surveys.

References

External links
 

Arbitration
Mediation
Dispute resolution